The Epiphone Coronet is an entry level guitar previously manufactured by Epiphone. The guitar has been manufactured a number of times since its first production on the 1950s.

History
The Coronet was first manufactured by Gibson under the Epiphone brand in 1959. It was priced at approximately $120, and was seen as a reliable entry level guitar.

Originally the Coronet came with a single Epiphone New York pickup in the treble position. In 1959, Epiphone began shipping new Coronets with a P-90 pickup and began offering the Coronet with its signature cherry red finish.

Some Coronets that were manufactured in the 1960s (from 1961) were made under the Dwight brand. Dwight was a house brand used by Gibson for Sonny Shields Music in East Saint Louis (Illinois), which was owned by Charles “Dwight” Shields. The first version of these Dwight-brand Coronets featured a "D" on the pickguard and the "Dwight" logo on the headstock, the second version (introduced in 1963) of these "Dwight" Coronets had an Epiphone "batwing" headstock with "Dwight model" on the trussrod cover and no "D" on its pickguard.  

In the 1970s, production of the Coronet came to a halt when Epiphone left its facilities in Kalamazoo, Michigan, to move overseas.

There was a short run of Coronets in the late 1990s, which were made in Korea. These featured OBL model pickups, a single coil in the neck position and a humbucker in the bridge position, with a pull-out tone knob to tap the humbucker. As was the case with the original Coronet, the hardware and style of the Coronet varied through this short run. Some had six-on-a-side batwing-shaped headstocks, while others had more classic 3-on-a-side Gibson-style headstocks. The short-lived USA Coronet of 1990 had a similar pickup layout and matching electronics except for the addition of a two-octave rosewood fingerboard with rectangular block markers and a reverse droopy Explorer-style headstock. The USA Coronets came with the choice of gold hardware with stop tailpiece or black hardware with licensed Floyd Rose locking tremolo.

Epiphone reissued the Coronet again in 2020 fitted with a wrap-around bridge, a single P-90 pickup, and available in black and cherry red finishes.

Notable users
 Marshall Crenshaw
 Pete Doherty
 Carl Barat
 Jimi Hendrix
 Ryan Jarman
 Johnny Marr
 Ryan Ross
 Steve Marriott
 Kate Nash
 Frank Portman
 Del Shannon
 Drew Shirley
 Ace Frehley
 Chris Walla
 Vigilante Carlstroem
 Grouper
 Wayne Kramer
 James McNew
 Kent Steedman
 Deniz Tek
 Pete Townshend
 Alex Turner (Arctic Monkeys)

References

External links

 Epiphone Coronet on Vintage Guitars
 Epiphone Coronet on Shanzu Guitars

Coronet